Shahrullah Kamboh  (1529 – 11 November 1599), better known as Shahbaz Khan Kamboh, was one of the generals of Mughal emperor Akbar. He participated in some of the most difficult expeditions of Akbar and annexed numerous territories to the empire. He was too orthodox a Sunni Muslim for Akbar's taste, but not only was he tolerated but also was greatly valued.  He was named “Mang Khan” (Punjabi: منگ خان) by the people of Lahore meaning “ask the Khan and it will be done” In Punjabi due to his legendary generosity. The very first ‘guzar’ in Lahore Fort was named Guzar Shahbaz Khan (Persian: گزر شاھباز خان) known locally as Guzar Mang Khan (Punjabi: گزر منگ خان).

Early life and family background
Born as Shahrullah, he belonged to Lahore's Kamboh clan and was the sixth-generation descendant of Haji Ismail Kamboh, a disciple of Bahauddin Zakariya. He had entered Mughal service during Akbar's time. The Emperor was very much impressed by his sagacity and sharpness of intellect at the very first sight and soon elevated him to the rank of Mir Tozak (Quarter-Master General) and later to an Amir (Minister). He was a very capable officer, a brave soldier and had rendered meritorious service to the Mughal empire in various capacities.  From a mansab of 100, he rapidly rose the number to 5000. As a Governor of Bengal, when operating in Brahmaputra, he had commanded 9000 strong cavalry.

He was an all-rounder officer and besides his military duties, he also helped Akbar in civil administration and financial matters. He became a very close confidant, a companion, a Mir Bakhshi (head of the military department, holding the rank of imperial minister) and a Vakil (Chief Administrator or Prime Minister) of Akbar and had acquired and exercised great powers. He was given the name Shahbaz Khan at this point. In 1581, when Emperor Akbar marched against Mirza Hakim to the Punjab, Shahbaz Khan came to Fatehpur and for about ten months, he took in his hands the reins of state administration in the absence of the Emperor.

As a General
In 1572, General Lashkar Khan entered the royal court in a drunken state and challenged anybody to come and fight with him. His rowdy and blatant behavior annoyed His Majesty so much that he was ordered to be arrested, tied to the tail of a horse and dragged and finally thrown into the prison. He was replaced with Shahbaz Khan whom the emperor made his Mir Bakshi (Paymaster-General). The title of Shahbaz Khan was also conferred on him.

Introducing Dagh-o-Mahali
As soon as Shahbaz Khan became Mir Bakshi, he introduced the Dagh-o-Mahali (a branding system) which had considerably cut down the over-heads as well as the corruption prevalent in the military departments of the kingdom. The system had been earlier in vogue during Alauddin Khalji as well as Sher Shah Suri but was discontinued during Mughal rule and was replaced with fief system which came to be badly misused by the Amirs and the officers. Under this system, the country was divided into numerous fiefs which were distributed among the Amirs. Unfortunately, they had become greedy, corrupt and oppressive and often also rebellious. Major part of the revenue was misappropriated  by the fief-holders for personal use. Shahbaz Khan changed the system and handled the branding system with such a skill and competency that not only it ended the rampant corruption but also improved discipline in the military and reduced needless financial burden on the imperial treasury. But the new system had earned Shahbaz Khan the hatred of the nobles like Mirza Aziz Koka He severely criticized the new system.

Battle against Arab Bahadur
General Shahbaz Khan had nearly driven Rana Pratap from the country when he was summoned by the emperor and sent with an army to support the forces in Bengal against Arab Bahadur. When Shahbaz Khan came near to Hajipur where Arab Bahadur had taken refuge with Raja Gajpati, he marched to attack him. For one month he carried operations against him clearing away the jungle and finally drove off Arab Bahadur and made the Raja Gajpati submit.

Battle against Bahadhur Khan-i-Shaibani
Bahadhur Khan-i-Shaibani and his brother Khan Zaman-i-Shaibani were Amir Viziers in the court of Akbar and both were holding big Jagirs, but as luck would have it, they rebelled against the emperor. With the help of Shahbaz Khan, Akbar crushed the rebellion with an iron hand. General Khan Zaman-i-Shaibani was killed in the battle but Bahadhur Khan was executed by Shahbaz Khan and Rai Bansi Das Kamboh on orders of the emperor.

As Governor of Bengal
On 18 May 1583, Shahbaz Khan was appointed Governor of Bengal. Initially, he had commanded 5000 cavalry and had distinguished himself greatly in Bengal, but later when operating in Brahmputra, he had commanded 9000 strong cavalry.

Tarsun Khan was engaged in war against Masum Khan. Shahbaz Khan's forces invested Dinajpur and Masum Khan was thus besieged in Dinajpur. The combined forces of Shahbaz Khan and Tarsun Khan attacked Masum Khan on November 15, 1583, but the latter fled to Bhati while Jabbari, an ally of Masum Khan, fled to Koch Bihar. Masum Khan got refuge with Isa Khan at Bhati.

Battle against Isa Khan
In 1584, Shahbaz Khan crossed Ganges near Khizirpur and seized Sonargaon and ravaged Bakatpur where Isa Khan was trenched. Initially he achieved a considerable success and even ravaged Katrabo, Khizirpur, Sonargaon and Egarasindur but finally suffered a defeat in the battle of Egarasindur and Bhawal. He was forced to retreat to the Mughal capital at Tanda. With reinforcements sent by Akbar, Shahbaz Khan again marched towards Bhati in 1586. Isa Khan attacked Shahbaz Khan at Bhawal (north of Dhaka) but forces of Shahbaz Khan were well fortified near Brahmaputra. Shahbaz Khan had commanded a 9000 strong cavalry at Brahmaputra.

In 1585, Shahbaz Khan subdued Raja of Kukrah or Coira Orissa (Chhota Nagpur) a tributary to the Crown. According to Ai’n-i-Akbari, Kukrah or Coira Orissa was a part of Bihar Subah.

Shahbaz Khan was sent to Deccan to help Murad. Shahbaz Khan reduced one Tiyuldar of Madhopur fort and obtained tribute from him. During conquest of Ahmmad Nagar, Shahbaz Khan harassed the Muslims and ravaged their houses which was greatly resented by Murad. Thereby, Shahbaz Khan left Murad without permission and reached Malwa. Akbar took away his Jagir and gave it Shah-Rukh and transferred Shahbaz Khan.

Reappointed as Governor of Bengal
In November 1586, Shahbaz Khan was again appointed Governor of Bengal in which capacity he served for two years before leaving in 1588. Shahbaz Khan was one of the best Khan during his governorship of Bangala and Orissa.

Shahbaz Khan had also subdued the pride of Raja Ram Chander Sain, Rai Surjan Handa & Dauda, Farhat Khan, Raja Gajpati, Raja Sri Ram, Rana Sangram as well as the officers of Surat. He reduced Jagdenpur, Ara, Shergarh, and Rahitas etc. These conquests had greatly enhanced the prestige and status of  Shahbaz Khan which were greatly appreciated by Akbar.

In 1589 AD, General Shabaz Khan led an expedition from Attock against the Yousafzai Afghans and defeated and dispersed them.

Imprisoned
Shahbaz Khan had been kept in confinement for three years before he paid a fine (ransom) of seven lacs of rupees. He was set free in 1599 and appointed as the deputy to the prince Jahangir in the administration of the province of Ajmer (Malwa). He was the General Administrator of Malwa which office he held till his death.

Shahbaz Khan died of illness on 11 November 1599 at Ajmer at the age of over 70 years.

As an administrator

Historian Abu-L-Fazl Alami, the author of Aiana-i-Akbari, attests that Shahbaz Khan was a very competent and capable General but Abu-L-Fazal also accuses him for his  bigoted Sunni views and arrogance. Many a times, he strongly opposed the emperor, but Akbar had a great regard for Shahbaz Khan and took it lightly.

The 9000 strong cavalry of General Shahbaz Khan is said to have comprised mostly the Kamboj (Kamboh) horsemen and it included both the Muslim as well as the Hindu Kamboj soldiers.

Shahbaz Khan was known for his generosity and liberality and the money he spent was so great that it made the people think that he had in his possession Philosopher's stone. He left behind a huge Jagir , treasures and other wealth. which was seized by Jahangir, son of Emperor Akbar after his death.

As a religious man
Shabaz Khan belonged the family whose ancestors were all celebrated for piety, asceticism and religiosity. Shahbaz Khan in early part of his life was celebrated for his religiosity till he first became deputy Kotwal of the Chabutara when he displayed his awareness of the (affairs of the) kingdom and judicious disposal of matters. Afterwards, he became Kotwal and became a favorite of Emperor Akbar. He was a capable officer and brave fighter and had rendered meritorious service to the state in various capacities.  A leading courtier of Akbar, he was strict follower of the law of Shari’ah and profusely recited blessings on Muhammad and distributed large sum of money in charities. Every Friday, he would donate one hundred Asharfis (gold coins) in memory of Abdul-Qadir Gilani.

Shahbaz Khan himself was deeply religious and pious man. He did not put on dress outside the sanction of simna (i.e. which had no sanction of Muhammad's action). He always carried a rosary in his hand, reciting all the while invocations of God's salutations on Muhammad and between the evening and sunset prayers, he would sit down facing west (qibla) and offering nimaz. He did not follow other Khans as long as  he was alive in shaving off his beard and drinking wine and did not have (the word)  Murid on his signet. He remained steadfast in the religion of Islam and left his name in the world of generosity and religiosity.

Emperor Akbar tried his best to bring General Shahbaz Khan and another General Qutb-ud-din Muhammad Khan Koka into his new faith known as Din-i-Ilahi but the move was strongly criticized by both of them. This, according to Abu-L-Fazl had created obstacles in his promotion upwards. On the other hand, many incompetent and junior officers got promoted which they did never deserve.

Guzar Shahbaz Khan
During the reign of The Mughal emperor Akbar the newly-constructed brick-walled city of Lahore was divided into nine ‘guzars’. The very first was named Guzar Shahbaz Khan (Persian: گزر شہباز خان), which area was popularly known among the people of the city as Guzar Mang Khan (Punjabi: گزر منگ خان).  The word ‘mang’ (Punjabi: منگ) comes from the Punjabi expression meaning ‘ask, and it will be done’. Due to his legendary generosity, almost making the people of Lahore and the surrounding areas think that he had unlimited wealth. For this reason he was termed Mang Khan (Punjabi: منگ خان), or ‘ask the Khan and it will be done’.

The guzar constitutes the entire area surrounding the Lahore Fort comprising the present Badshahi Mosque, including Taxali to the middle of Masti and Kashmiri gates, designed like a military arc to protect the emperor and his fort. it is ascribed that building of the Lahore Fort and the walled city by Mughal Emperor Akbar was a military suggestion of Shahbaz Khan. The free labour available during the four year long Great Lahore Famine, that lived off the free kitchens, was utilised in the construction.

References

See also
 Kamboj in Muslim and British Era
 List of rulers of Bengal
 Kamboj
 Kambojas

1529 births
1599 deaths
Mughal generals
Medieval India
16th-century soldiers